My Glorious Brothers is a historical novel by the Jewish American novelist Howard Fast, depicting the 167 BC Maccabeean revolt against the Greek-Seleucid Empire. The book, which deals with Jewish independence and self-determination, was published in 1948, during the 1947–1949 Palestine war.

The story takes place in the days before the rebellion, and during the ensuing battles. The heroes of the novel are the Hasmoneans in general, and Judas Maccabeus in particular. In addition to the historical facts, Fast added some personal rivalries among the Maccabean brothers.

External links
Howard Fast: My Glorious Brothers

1948 American novels
American historical novels
Cultural depictions of the Maccabees
History books about Jews and Judaism
Novels by Howard Fast
Novels set in ancient Israel
Israel in fiction
Novels set in the 2nd century BC